Taima Moeke-Pickering is a Canadian-New Zealand academic, a Māori, of Ngāti Pūkeko and Tuhoe descent and as of 2019 is a full professor at the Laurentian University.

Academic career

After years of working as a professor and administrator at the University of Waikato and years at Waikato Institute of Technology, Moeke-Pickering moved to Canada in 2006 to take up a position as an  assistant professor in the School of Indigenous Relations at Laurentian University.  She completed her PhD in 2010 titled  'Decolonisation as a social change framework and its impact on the development of Indigenous-based curricula for Helping Professionals in mainstream Tertiary Education Organisations'. At Laurentian University, Moeke-Pickering rose to full professor in 2019.

Selected works 
 Moeke-Pickering, Taima Materangatira. "Maori identity within whanau: A review of literature." (1996).
 Moeke-Pickering, Taima, Mate Heitia, Sonny Heitia, Rolinda Karapu, and Sheila Cote-Meek. "Understanding Maori food security and food sovereignty issues in Whakatane." Mai Journal 4, no. 1 (2015): 29–42.
 Moeke-Pickering, Taima M., Mahalia K. Paewai, Amelia Turangi-Joseph, and Averil ML Herbert. "Clinical psychology in Aotearoa/New Zealand: indigenous perspectives." (2017).
 Moeke-Pickering, Taima, Sheila Hardy, Susan Manitowabi, A. Mawhiney, Emily Faries, Kelly Gibson-van Marrewijk, Nancy Tobias, and Mikaere Taitoko. "Keeping our fire alive: Towards decolonising research in the academic setting." WINHEC (World Indigenous Higher Education Consortium) Journal (2006).
Moeke-Pickering, T., Cote-Meek, S., & Pegoraro.  "Critical Reflections and Politics on Advancing Women in the Academy" (2020) @IGI Global Books
Cote-Meek, S. & Moeke-Pickering, T. "Decolonizing and Indigenizing Education in Canada" (2020) Canadian Scholar Books
Moeke-Pickering, T. "Taking me home: The life of Mere Hiki" in Red Dresses on Bare Trees: Stories and Reflection on Missing and Murdered Indigenous Women and Girls (2021) J. Charlton Publishing
Moeke-Pickering, T. "Honouring Papatuanuku: Honouring Mother Earth" in The Clean Place: Honouring Indigenous Spiritual Roots of Turtle Island (2019) J" Charlton Publishing
Moeke-Pickering, T., Rowat, J., Cote-Meek, S. & Pegoraro, A. "Indigenous Social Activism Using Twitter: Amplifying Voices Using #MMIWG in Indigenous Peoples Rise Up: The Global Ascendency of Social Media Activism (2021) Rutgers University Press.
Moeke-Pickering, T., Cote-Meek, S. & Pegoraro, A. "Understanding the ways missing and murdered Indigenous women are framed and handled by social media users (2018). IN @Sage Journals Media International Australia.

References

External links
 
 

Living people
Year of birth missing (living people)
Academic staff of Laurentian University
Canadian women academics
New Zealand emigrants to Canada
New Zealand Māori women academics